Shayne Pospisil (born May 15, 1985), or "Pizzle"  as known among friends, is an American all-around snowboarder. He is best known for his successes in the sport of snowboarding.

Early years

Pospisil trained at the Okemo Mountain School, known in the boarding world as Snowboard Academy. Pospisil has trained on many different terrains across the United States.

Snowboarding career

Pospisil has competed against (and taken out) some of the biggest names in snowboarding including Travis Rice, Bjorn Leines, and Shaun White.  His biggest accomplishment was at the, arguably the biggest urban snowboard event in North America.  He beat the competition, performing a frontside 900, a backside 900, and a combination finale to capture the top prize in front of 20,000 people in New York City's East River Park.

He admires extreme athletes like Kelly Slater, Danny Kass and Tony Hawk, who have helped put their respective sports on the map, and he credits most of his success to the dedication of his family.  While Shayne can thank snowboarding for his recent success and notoriety, he is quick to mention that his first love lies with surfing. He was a competitive surfer before he began competing in snowboarding.

Awards and Championships

References

External links
Yo Beat Hump Day Goes Jersey With Shayne Pospisil

1985 births
Living people
American male snowboarders
American skateboarders
Sportspeople from Monmouth County, New Jersey
American surfers
People from Manasquan, New Jersey